Ren Qin (born 28 March 1962) is a Chinese wrestler. He competed in the men's freestyle 68 kg at the 1984 Summer Olympics.

References

1962 births
Living people
Chinese male sport wrestlers
Olympic wrestlers of China
Wrestlers at the 1984 Summer Olympics
Place of birth missing (living people)
Wrestlers at the 1986 Asian Games
Asian Games competitors for China
20th-century Chinese people
21st-century Chinese people